Cantando 2012 is the fourth season of Cantando por un Sueño and was premiered on El Trece, in May 2012. The list of contestants and dreamers was closed with a total of 18 pairs, two of them composed by two celebrities. At this moment, is the season with the most celebrities competing for the title, and the first season of Cantando por un Sueño that featured a couple composed by two women.

The show is presented by the Argentinian host José María Listorti, and this is the first time, he is presenting the show alone, after presenting Cantando 2011 with Denise Dumas.

The judges for this season are singer Valeria Lynch, music producer Óscar Mediavilla, journalist Marcelo Polino, and the famous Argentine duet, Pimpinela, composed by Joaquín and Lucía Galán.

Couples 

In the thirteenth week, there was a repechage, and the following couples came back into the competition:
Yanina Iglesias & Augusto Buccafusco
Camilo García & Nadia Robledo
Soledad Cescato & Andrea López
Belén France (Adabel Guerrero's replacement) & Nicolás Martinelli
Daniel "Tota" Santillán (Jorge Ibañez's replacement) & Mavi Toledo

Scoring chart

 indicate the lowest score for each week.
 indicate the highest score for each week.
 indicates the couple eliminated that week.
 indicates the couple was saved by the public.
 indicates the couple was saved by the jury.
 indicates the winning couple.
 indicates the runner-up couple.
 indicates the semi-finalists couples.

 During this round, all the couples sang in a duel. The judges did not score the performance, instead, they saved 12 couples, and the other 3 went to the public vote. 2 couples were eliminated.
 During this round, all the couples sang in a duel. The judges did not score the performance, instead, they saved some couples, leaving 2 that went to the public vote. 1 couple was eliminated.

Weekly scores and songs

Round 1
Unless indicated otherwise, individual judges scores in the charts below (given in parentheses) are listed in this order from left to right: Joaquín Galán, Lucía Galán, Óscar Mediavilla, Marcelo Polino, Valeria Lynch. Also, the secret vote, is in bold.

 Key
  – The couple was saved by the judges
  – The couple was saved by the public vote
  – The couple was eliminated

Running order

Round 2

Running order

Round 3

Running order

Round 4

Running order

Round 5

Running order

Round 6

Running order

Round 7

Running order

Round 8

Running order

Round 9

Running order

Round 10

Running order

Round 11

Running order

Round 12

Running order

Round 13 – Repechage
During this round, the eliminated couples came back for a second chance. Only 5 couple re-entered into the competition: 2 were chosen by the judges, and 3 were chosen by the public vote. Some celebrities declined the offer of coming back, so they had replacements:

Claudia Albertario was replaced by Ayelén Paleo
Cecilia Bonelli was replaced by Julieta Bal
Alejandra Maglietti was replaced by Sofía Pachano
Jorge Ibáñez was replaced by Daniel "Tota" Santillán
Adabel Guerrero was replaced by Belén Francese

Running order

Round 14

Running order

Round 15

Running order

Round 16

Running order

During this round, Soledad Cescato as replaced by Jorge Moliniers.

Round 17

Running order

Round 18
During this round, all the couples went to a duel, and the judges saved 3 couples, that advanced to the semi-finals. The other 3, when to the public vote, and 2 of them were eliminated.

Running order

References

External links 
  Canal 13's Showmatch website

Argentine variety television shows